The Northern Territory Minister for Territory Families is a Minister of the Crown in the Government of the Northern Territory. The minister administers their portfolio through Territory Families.

The Minister is responsible for child guardianship, child protection, children and families policy, children's services, family and parent support services, family responsibility agreements and orders, family violence services, men's and women's policy, multicultural affairs, pensioner and carer concessions, out of home care, the Seniors Card, seniors policy, youth affairs and services and youth detention.

The current minister is Dale Wakefield (Labor). She was sworn in on 12 September 2016 following the Labor victory at the 2016 election. The ministry and department were both created in a reorganisation by the incoming government, which was significant for having separated youth justice from adult correctional services for the first time following the Don Dale Youth Detention Centre scandal and subsequent Royal Commission into Juvenile Detention in the Northern Territory.

The enlarged Territory Families ministry replaced a number of separate ministries from the preceding Giles Ministry, including the ministers for children and families, women's policy, men's policy, multicultural affairs, Senior Territorians and Young Territorians. The Minister for Children in the Gunner Ministry is a new position concerned with "whole of government children's policy", while specific areas of child-related policy lie in Territory Families.

List of Ministers for Territory Families

Children and Families / Family and Community Services

Women

Multicultural Affairs

Senior Territorians

Young Territorians

Former posts

Child Protection

Men's Policy

References

Northern Territory-related lists
Ministers of the Northern Territory government